Bagratid Kingdom may refer to:

Bagratid Armenia, AD 885 to 1045
Bagratid Iberia, AD 888 to 1008
Kingdom of Georgia, AD 1008 to 1463

Medieval history of the Caucasus
Former countries in Europe